Kingsford is both a surname and a given name. Notable people with the name include:

Surname
Anna Kingsford (1846-1888), advocate of women's rights and vegetarianism
Charles Lethbridge Kingsford (1862-1926), English historian and topographer 
 Florence Kingsford (1871-1949), English illustrator better known as Florence Kingsford Cockerell
Philip Kingsford (1891-?), athlete
Richard Ash Kingsford, Australian politician
Robert Kingsford (1849-1895), footballer
Walter Kingsford (1882-1958), actor
William Kingsford (1819-1898), historian

Given name
Kingsford Dibela (1932–2002), former Governor-General of Papua New Guinea
 Sir Charles Kingsford Smith (1897-1935), Australian aviator